Linea Aeropostal Venezolana Flight 253 may refer to:

 Linea Aeropostal Venezolana Flight 253 (June 1956), an airliner that crashed in the Atlantic Ocean off New Jersey on 20 June 1956
 Linea Aeropostal Venezolana Flight 253 (November 1956), an airliner that crashed in Venezuela on 27 November 1956

Flight number disambiguation pages